Ardisiaquinones are a group of closely-related chemical compounds found in plants in the genus Ardisia.  The first examples, ardisiaquinones A-C, were isolated in 1968 from Ardisia sieboldii.  In 1995, ardisiaquinones D, E, and F were discovered, also from Ardisia sieboldii.  In 2001, ardisiaquinones G, H and I were isolated from Ardisia teysmanniana.

Chemically, the ardisiaquinones consist of two variably-substituted 1,4-benzoquinone units connected by a long alkyl or alkenyl chain.

Research
Ardisiaquinones are of research interest because they possess 5-lipoxygenase (5-LOX) inhibitor activity and 5-LOX has clinical relevance in inflammation.  For example, ardisiaquinone A protects against liver injury in an animal model of ischemia-reperfusion injury.  Likewise, ardisiaquinone G has also shown 5-LOX inhibition.  Ardisiaquinone A has also been shown to have an antiallergic effect in an animal model.  Other ardisiaquinones have shown antiproliferative and antimicrobial effects in vitro.

Laboratory syntheses of ardisiaquinones A and B have been reported.

Chemical structures

References

Benzoquinones
Ardisia